The Last of the Carnabys is a 1917 American silent drama film directed by William Parke and starring Gladys Hulette, William Parke Jr., and Eugenie Woodward.

Cast
 Gladys Hulette as Lucy Carnaby 
 William Parke Jr. as Gordon Carnaby 
 Eugenie Woodward as Lucy's mother 
 Paul Everton as Charles Etheridge 
 Harry Benham as Johnn Rand 
 J.H. Gilmour as Butler 
 Helene Chadwick as The Kept Woman

References

Bibliography
 Donald W. McCaffrey & Christopher P. Jacobs. Guide to the Silent Years of American Cinema. Greenwood Publishing, 1999.

External links
 

1917 films
1917 drama films
1910s English-language films
American silent feature films
Silent American drama films
American black-and-white films
Films directed by William Parke
Pathé Exchange films
1910s American films